Thiago Vasconcelos Ribeiro Da Silva (born 23 January 1985 in Rio de Janeiro), known as just Thiago Ribeiro, is a Brazilian professional footballer who plays for Royal Pari FC.

Club statistics

Updated to games played as of 9 December 2014.

References

External links
MLSZ 
HLSZ 

1985 births
Living people
Footballers from Rio de Janeiro (city)
Brazilian footballers
Association football midfielders
Clube Atlético Juventus players
BFC Siófok players
Barcsi SC footballers
Veszprém LC footballers
Dunaújváros PASE players
Nemzeti Bajnokság I players
Nemzeti Bajnokság II players
Bolivian Primera División players
Brazilian expatriate footballers
Expatriate footballers in Hungary
Brazilian expatriate sportspeople in Hungary
Expatriate footballers in Bolivia
Brazilian expatriate sportspeople in Bolivia